Biești is a commune in Orhei District, Moldova. It is composed of three villages: Biești, Cihoreni and Slobozia-Hodorogea.

Notable people
 Andrei Hodorogea (1878 in Slobozia-Hodorogea – 1917 in Chișinău) was a politician from Bessarabia
 Protosinghelul Dosoftei Vîrlan (?–1933)
 Gheorghe Andronache (1883–?)
 Teodor Vicol (1888–?)
 Nicanor Crocos (1890–1977)
 Stela Popescu (1935–2017), actress
 Andrei Munteanu (born 1939)

References

Communes of Orhei District